Marc Zeno (born May 21, 1965 in New Orleans) is a former professional American football player. He played college ball at Tulane University.

College
Zeno attended Tulane from 1984 to 1987, where he played wide receiver and broke the National Collegiate Athletic Association career receiving record with 3,725 yards. He was named to the 1987 College Football All-America Team.

Pro career
In 1988, Zeno was drafted in the 7th round (182 overall) by the Pittsburgh Steelers. Zeno's draft valued dropped from its original expectation because his poor performance at the National Football league combined with off-season knee injuries. He ran a 4.8 40-yard dash. Zeno responded to his performance by saying "I'm capable of running a 4.6 in the 40, but I'm not capable of running a 4.3 or 4.4, and they should know that. I'm a football player, not a track star." In 1989, he was a member of the Green Bay Packers training camp but was released on July 27, 1989. Later he signed with the Calgary Stampeders. In 1990, he was a member of the British Columbia Lions. In 1991, he was the 80th wide receiver drafted in the WLAF Draft by the Raleigh–Durham Skyhawks. In 1991, he played for the Tampa Bay Storm of the Arena Football League.

References

1965 births
Living people
Players of American football from New Orleans
Tulane Green Wave football players
African-American players of American football
Raleigh–Durham Skyhawks players
Tampa Bay Storm players
Calgary Stampeders players
BC Lions players
American football wide receivers
Canadian football wide receivers
21st-century African-American people
20th-century African-American sportspeople